Angeline Ngahina Greensill (born 1948) is a New Zealand Māori political rights campaigner, academic and leader.

Early life
Greensill is of Tainui, Ngāti Porou, and Ngāti Paniora descent, born in the late 1940s in Hamilton and raised at Raglan, on the turangawaewae of Tainui o Tainui ki Whaingaroa.  She was educated at Raglan Primary, Raglan District High School, Hamilton Technical College, Hamilton Teachers College and at Waikato University. She holds a Trained Teachers Certificate, LLB (Bachelor of Laws), Bachelor of Social Sciences with 1st class Honours and completed a Masters of Social Science in 2010, with a thesis on the Resource Management Act, supervised by Robyn Longhurst.

Greensill's first job was as a primary school teacher both in New Zealand and in Brisbane.  Between 1984–1996 while raising her young family, she worked for her hapu as co-ordinator of employment and skills training and conservation programmes for youth in the Raglan Catchment area. After completing a law degree she was employed by University of Waikato in 1999 to teach in the Department of Geography, Tourism and Environmental Planning specialising in treaties, Māori geography and resource management.

The environment

As an advocate for the protection of the environment  and for Maori land rights of West Coast whanau and hapu in the Whaingaroa area since the mid-70s, Greensill's legal efforts have been crucial in helping to block human-cow transgenic field trials being conducted by AgResearch Ltd, and helped to educate Māori communities on the implications of genetic engineering. Due to her expertise in this field she was interviewed in the documentary film The Leech and the Earthworm by Max Pugh and Marc Silver.

Land rights
Greensill assisted in organising the land occupation at the Raglan Golf Course (see Māori protest movement), which played a prominent role in helping recognise issues around  Māori land rights in New Zealand. Greensill was with her mother, Eva Rickard, when she was arrested on charges of trespassing. Due to prolonged legal efforts the land was later returned to the local tribe. Greensill was also involved in land occupations at Bastion Point, Awhitu, and others elsewhere.

Political background
Greensill was one of the final co-leaders of the Mana Māori Movement, which she called into recess in 2005 so that the combined efforts of that party could be utilised in the founding and promoting of the Māori Party. In the past Greensill supported Māori political party Mana Motuhake. One policy Greensill has advocated for is  the recognition in law of the 1835 Declaration of Independence.

In 2011, however, she joined the breakaway Mana Party, saying that the Māori Party was no longer listening to the people.

See also
 Māori Party
 Eva Rickard
 Raglan
 Tainui
 Māori protest movement
 Bastion Point
 Land rights
 Protest

References

External links 

 

University of Waikato alumni
Academic staff of the University of Waikato
Leaders of political parties in New Zealand
1948 births
Living people
People from Hamilton, New Zealand
People from Raglan, New Zealand
Māori Party politicians
21st-century New Zealand politicians
Mana Movement politicians
Mana Māori Movement politicians
Unsuccessful candidates in the 2011 New Zealand general election
Unsuccessful candidates in the 1996 New Zealand general election
Unsuccessful candidates in the 2008 New Zealand general election
Unsuccessful candidates in the 2002 New Zealand general election
Unsuccessful candidates in the 1999 New Zealand general election
Unsuccessful candidates in the 2005 New Zealand general election
Unsuccessful candidates in the 2014 New Zealand general election
21st-century New Zealand women politicians